Belfast South is a parliamentary constituency in the United Kingdom House of Commons. The current MP is Claire Hanna of the SDLP.

Boundaries

1885–1918: In the Borough of Belfast, that part of Cromac ward not in the constituency of Belfast East, that part of St. George's ward not in the constituency of Belfast West, and the townlands of Malone Lower and that part of Malone Upper within the parliamentary borough in the parish of Shankill.

1922–1974: The County Borough of Belfast wards of Cromac, Ormeau, and Windsor.

1974–1983: The County Borough of Belfast wards of Cromac, Ormeau, and Windsor, the District of Lisburn electoral divisions of Ardmore, Dunmurry, Finaghy, and Upper Malone, and the Rural District of Hillsborough electoral divisions of Breda and Edenderry.

1983–1997: The District of Belfast wards of Ballynafeigh, Cromac, Donegall, Finaghy, Malone, Ormeau, Rosetta, St George's, Stranmillis, University, Upper Malone, Willowfield, and Windsor.

1997–2010: The District of Belfast wards of Ballynafeigh, Blackstaff, Botanic, Finaghy, Malone, Musgrave, Ravenhill, Rosetta, Shaftesbury, Stranmillis, Upper Malone, Windsor, and Woodstock, and the District of Castlereagh wards of Beechill, Cairnshill, Galwally, Knockbracken, Minnowburn, and Newtownbreda.

2010–present: The District of Belfast wards above and the District of Castlereagh wards as above plus Carryduff East, Carryduff West, Hillfoot, and Wynchurch.

The seat was created in 1922 when, as part of the establishment of the devolved Stormont Parliament for Northern Ireland, the number of MPs in the Westminster Parliament was drastically cut. The seat is centred on the Belfast City Council districts of Balmoral, Laganbank and Pottinger and also contains part of the district of Castlereagh.

Prior to the 2010 general election the Boundary Commission proposed expanding Belfast South further into Castlereagh, taking in areas currently contained in both Strangford and Belfast East. This was strongly opposed by the DUP but supported by the Ulster Unionists. It was also one of the issues which generated the most negative comments in the written submissions with a petition representing half of Cregagh's residents opposing its move.

Following the local enquiries, the Boundary Commission proposed retaining the Cregagh ward in East Belfast while transferring instead the Hillfoot ward. These proposals were submitted as final recommendations and were put into force through the passing of the Northern Ireland Parliamentary Constituencies Order in 2008.

History
In the late nineteenth and early twentieth centuries, Belfast South tended to elect 'rebel unionists' such as William Johnston, who famously defied a ban on Orange marches, and Thomas Sloan, founder of the Independent Orange Order.

Belfast South contains some of Belfast's most expensive residential districts as well as Queen's University Belfast. The overall tenor of the constituency is middle-class – young, trendy and cosmopolitan towards the city centre, with Northern Ireland's biggest concentrations of both students and ethnic minorities, and further out from the city centre it is settled and prosperous. Despite this, significant pockets of inner-city working class areas such as the Markets and a number of isolated suburban estates exist in the constituency.

There has been particularly rapid demographic change in Belfast South since around the year 2000. The 2011 census revealed that Belfast South consists of a slightly larger Catholic population than Protestant and while the constituency traditionally has had a unionist majority, the nationalist vote has now surpassed this in more recent elections. There have also been strong votes for other parties such as the Alliance Party of Northern Ireland, Green Party, the Conservatives and the Northern Ireland Women's Coalition. The constituency has witnessed a steady series of candidates backed by groups who aspire to support the British Labour Party despite its prior ban on membership and organisation in Northern Ireland, though their results have been minimal. Until the 1990s the main focus of attention has been on contests between unionist candidates.

In the February 1974 general election the seat was won by Robert Bradford of the Vanguard Unionist Progressive Party on a united anti-Sunningdale Agreement slate with the Ulster Unionist Party and the Democratic Unionist Party. He defeated Rafton Pounder, the sitting Unionist MP who defended his seat as a Pro-Assembly Unionist. Bradford held the seat for the next seven years, though in February 1978 he and the rump of Vanguard reunited with the Ulster Unionists. At the end of 1981 Bradford was assassinated by the IRA in a Belfast community centre while hosting a political surgery.

The subsequent by-election garnered much interest as it was expected that the Democratic Unionist Party would take the seat, building on their steady rise which had seen them gain both Belfast North and Belfast East at the previous general election. However, the DUP came third, behind the Alliance Party of Northern Ireland, and the UUP's candidate Martin Smyth won the seat, holding it until 2005. The by-election was extremely significant at the time in that it was the first at which the DUP tide ebbed.

In January 2005 Smyth announced that he would be retiring at the 2005 general election, raising speculation both as to whom the Ulster Unionists would field in succession to him and what effect a different candidate would have upon their share of the vote. The UUP selected Assembly member Michael McGimpsey, albeit with a highly controversial and bitter selection. McGimpsey was repudiated by many prominent Unionists, including both Smyth and former UUP leader James Molyneaux. The DUP selected Jimmy Spratt and offered an electoral pact to the UUP that would give each party a free run at one out of South Belfast and Fermanagh and South Tyrone. This offer was rejected by the UUP.

In the event, the DUP and UUP both fielded candidates which split the vote. The nationalist vote mainly went for the SDLP over Sinn Féin, with the result that the SDLP took the seat despite a majority of votes cast for unionist candidates.

In 2010, Sinn Féin opted not to stand against the SDLP to avoid splitting the nationalist vote. The SDLP won the seat with a majority of 6,000. This was the seat in which the Alliance Party had their second-best showing, polling 15% of the votes. Alasdair McDonnell retained the seat in May 2015, with only 24.5% of the vote, as Sinn Féin opted to stand. This is the smallest proportion of the vote a winning candidate has ever achieved in a UK general election.

In 2017 the seat was won by Emma Little-Pengelly of the DUP with Alasdair McDonnell losing his seat along with all other SDLP MPs in Northern Ireland. This was won back for the SDLP by Claire Hanna in 2019, with Sinn Féin again opting not to stand. This was the first time since 1987 that the winning candidate in the constituency had a majority of the vote.

Members of Parliament
The Member of Parliament since the 2019 general election is Claire Hanna of the Social Democratic and Labour Party, succeeding Emma Little-Pengelly of the Democratic Unionist Party.

Election results

Elections in the 2010s

 

This seat saw the largest SDLP vote share and the largest increase in vote share for the party at the 2019 general election. This came as Sinn Féin did not contest the seat. It also saw the only fall in vote share for Alliance.

Elections in the 2000s

Elections in the 1990s

1997 Changes are compared to the 1992 notional results shown below.

Elections in the 1980s

Note: The by-election was caused by the decision of all Unionist MPs to resign their seats and seek re-election on a platform of opposition to the Anglo-Irish Agreement.

Elections in the 1970s

Elections in the 1960s

Elections in the 1950s

Elections in the 1940s

Elections in the 1930s

Elections in the 1920s

Elections in the 1910s

Elections in the 1900s

Elections in the 1890s

Elections in the 1880s

See also
 List of parliamentary constituencies in Northern Ireland

References 
Specific

General
4. Correction: Clare Bailey, Green Party in Northern Ireland (not Green Party of England and Wales)

Further reading
F. W. S. Craig, British Parliamentary Election Results 1918 – 1949
F. W. S. Craig, British Parliamentary Election Results 1950 – 1970
The Liberal Year Book For 1917, Liberal Publication Department
The Constitutional Year Book For 1912, Conservative Central Office
The Constitutional Year Book For 1894, Conservative Central Office

External links 
Politics Resources (Election results from 1922 onwards)
Electoral Calculus (Election results from 1955 onwards)
2017 Election House Of Commons Library 2017 Election report
A Vision Of Britain Through Time (Constituency elector numbers)
BBC News, Election 2005
BBC News, Vote 2001
Guardian Unlimited Politics

Politicsresources.net - Official Web Site ✔  (Election results from 1951 to the present)

Westminster Parliamentary constituencies in Belfast
Westminster Parliamentary constituencies in Northern Ireland
Constituencies of the Parliament of the United Kingdom established in 1885
Constituencies of the Parliament of the United Kingdom disestablished in 1918
Constituencies of the Parliament of the United Kingdom established in 1922